Gateway is a neighborhood located in the central part of Camden, New Jersey. According to the 2000 U.S. Census, Gateway has a population of 2,439.

Campbell Soup Company, Our Lady of Lourdes Medical Center and the Ferry Avenue station of the PATCO Speedline are located in Gateway.

Subaru of America moved into their new 250,000 square foot headquarters in 2018.

References

Neighborhoods in Camden, New Jersey